Earl of Lindsey is a title in the Peerage of England. It was created in 1626 for the 14th Baron Willoughby de Eresby (see Baron Willoughby de Eresby for earlier history of the family). He was First Lord of the Admiralty from 1635 to 1636 and also established his claim in right of his mother to the hereditary office of Lord Great Chamberlain of England. Lord Lindsey fought on the Royalist side in the Civil War and was mortally wounded at the Battle of Edgehill on 23 October 1642. He was succeeded by his son, the second Earl. He also fought at Edgehill and surrendered to the Parliamentarians in order to attend his mortally wounded father. Lord Lindsey later fought at the First Battle of Newbury, Second Battle of Newbury, and at Naseby. His son from his second marriage, James, was created Earl of Abingdon in 1682. He was succeeded by his son from his first marriage to Martha Cockayne, the third Earl. He represented Boston in the House of Commons and served as Lord Lieutenant of Lincolnshire.

His son, the fourth Earl, was summoned to the House of Lords in 1690 through a writ of acceleration in his father's junior title of Baron Willoughby de Eresby. He later served as Chancellor of the Duchy of Lancaster and as Lord Lieutenant of Lincolnshire and was one of the Lords Justices before the arrival of King George I. In 1706 he was created Marquess of Lindsey and in 1715 he was further honoured when he was made Duke of Ancaster and Kesteven. Both titles were in the Peerage of Great Britain. His son, the second Duke, was called to the House of Lords in 1715 through a writ of acceleration as Baron Willoughby de Eresby. He later served as Lord Lieutenant of Lincolnshire. He was succeeded by his son, the third Duke. He was a General in the Army and served as Master of the Horse from 1766 to 1778. He was also Lord Lieutenant of Lincolnshire. His son, the fourth Duke, was briefly Lord Lieutenant of Lincolnshire but died unmarried in 1779 at an early age. On his death the barony of Willoughby de Eresby fell into abeyance between his sisters Lady Priscilla and Georgiana, Marchioness of Cholmondeley, who also jointly inherited the office of Lord Great Chamberlain (the abeyance was terminated in 1780 in favour of Priscilla; see the Baron Willoughby de Eresby for later history of this title).

The late Duke was succeeded in the earldom, marquessate and dukedom by his uncle, the fifth Duke. He represented Lincoln in Parliament and served as Lord Lieutenant of Lincolnshire. He had no sons and on his death in 1809 the marquessate and dukedom became extinct. He was succeeded in the earldom of Lindsey by his third cousin, the ninth Earl. He was the great-grandson of the Hon. Charles Bertie, fifth son of the second Earl. Lord Lindsey was a General in the Army and also sat as Member of Parliament for Stamford. On the death in 1938 of his grandson, the twelfth Earl, the line of the fifth son of the second Earl failed. The late Earl was succeeded by his distant relative (his fifth cousin thrice removed) the eighth Earl of Abingdon (see this title for earlier history of this branch of the family), who became the thirteenth Earl. However, it was not until 1951 the Lord Abingdon was recognised in the earldom of Lindsey.  the title is held by his first cousin, the fourteenth Earl of Lindsey and ninth Earl of Abingdon.

The family seat is at Gilmilnscroft House, near Mauchline, in East Ayrshire.

Earls of Lindsey (1626)

Robert Bertie, 1st Earl of Lindsey (1582–1642)
Montagu Bertie, 2nd Earl of Lindsey (1608–1666)
Robert Bertie, 3rd Earl of Lindsey (1630–1701)
Robert Bertie, 4th Earl of Lindsey (1660–1723) (created Marquess of Lindsey in 1706 and Duke of Ancaster and Kesteven in 1715)

Dukes of Ancaster and Kesteven (1715)

Robert Bertie, 1st Duke of Ancaster and Kesteven, 4th Earl of Lindsey (1660–1723)
Peregrine Bertie, 2nd Duke of Ancaster and Kesteven, 5th Earl of Lindsey (1686–1742)
Peregrine Bertie, 3rd Duke of Ancaster and Kesteven, 6th Earl of Lindsey (1714–1778)
Robert Bertie, 4th Duke of Ancaster and Kesteven, 7th Earl of Lindsey (1756–1779)
Brownlow Bertie, 5th Duke of Ancaster and Kesteven, 8th Earl of Lindsey (1729–1809)

Earls of Lindsey (1626; Reverted)
Albemarle Bertie, 9th Earl of Lindsey (1744–1818)
George Augustus Frederick Albemarle Bertie, 10th Earl of Lindsey (1814–1877)
Montague Peregrine Bertie, 11th Earl of Lindsey (1815–1899)
Montague Peregrine Albemarle Bertie, 12th Earl of Lindsey (1861–1938)
Montagu Henry Edmund Towneley-Bertie, 13th Earl of Lindsey, 8th Earl of Abingdon (1887–1963)
Richard Henry Rupert Bertie, 14th Earl of Lindsey, 9th Earl of Abingdon (b. 1931)

The heir apparent is the present holder's son Henry Mark Willoughby Bertie, Lord Norreys (b. 1958).
The heir apparent's heir apparent is his son Hon. Willoughby Henry Constantine St Maur (b. 1996).

Arms

See also
Earl of Abingdon
Baron Willoughby de Eresby
Earl of Ancaster
Viscount Bertie of Thame
Lady Charlotte Guest

References

Further reading

Kidd, Charles, Williamson, David (editors). Debrett's Peerage and Baronetage (1990 edition). New York: St Martin's Press, 1990.

External links

Earldoms in the Peerage of England
Lindsey
Noble titles created in 1626